Boki may refer to:

 The Boki people of Nigeria
 The Boki language
 Boki, Nigeria, a Local Government Area of Nigeria

People 
 Boki (surname)
 Boki (Hawaiian chief) (before 1785–after 1829), Royal Governor of Oahu
 Boki Milošević (1931–2018), Serbian clarinetist
 Boki Nachbar (born 1980), Slovenian basketball player 
 Boki.b (born 1983), Croatian illustrator

See also